Champsodon nudivittis, also known as the nakedband gaper, is a species of marine ray-finned fish, a crocodile toothfish belonging to the family Champsodontidae. It occurs in the Indo-West Pacific from Madagascar, Indonesia, the Philippines and Australia. It was recorded in 2008 in Iskenderun Bay on the Mediterranean coast of Turkey, likely introducted by ballast water. It is now commonly found from Greece to Israel in the eastern Mediterranean Sea.

References

nudivittis
Fish described in 1895